Shakeel (born 1938) is a Pakistani actor.

Shakeel may also refer to:

Shakeel (horse) (born 2014), French Thoroughbred racehorse and sire.
Shakeel (name), given and surname

See also
Shaquille (disambiguation)